Teatro Florida  is a municipal theatre in the city of Algeciras, southeastern Spain. The building was constructed between 1944 and 1945, by the architect Mariano Aznárez Torán,  with an expressionist-inspired facade with a geometric design. In 2006 the old theatre underwent a full restoration, promoted by the government of the Province of Cádiz due to the poor conditions of the old building. The first event held in the theatre after rehabilitation was a local contest held on 11 December 2011, before the official reopening on December 20 of the same year.

References

External links
 Official site

Theatres in Spain
Teatro Florida
Theatres completed in 1945